The Armed Forces Expeditionary Medal (AFEM) is a military award of the United States Armed Forces, which was first created in 1961 by Executive Order of President John Kennedy. The medal is awarded to members of the U.S. Armed Forces who, after July 1, 1958, participated in U.S. military operations, U.S. operations in direct support of the United Nations, or U.S. operations of assistance for friendly foreign nations.

Appearance
The Armed Forces Expeditionary Medal is issued as a bronze medal, 1  inches in diameter.

The obverse side of the medal consists of an eagle, with wings addorsed and inverted (representing the strength of the United States Armed Forces), standing on a sword loosened in its scabbard, and super- imposed on a radiant compass rose of eight points, (representing the readiness to serve wherever needed) all within the circumscription "ARMED FORCES" above and "EXPEDITIONARY SERVICE" below with a sprig of laurel on each side. On the reverse side of the medal is the shield from the United States Coat of Arms above two laurel branches separated by a bullet, all within the circumscription "UNITED STATES OF AMERICA".

The ribbon is 1  inches wide and consists of the following stripes:  inch Green,  inch Golden Yellow,  inch Spicebrown,  inch Black,  inch Bluebird,  inch Ultramarine Blue,  inch White,  inch Scarlet,  inch Bluebird,  inch Black,  inch Spicebrown,  inch Golden Yellow and  inch Green.

Ribbon devices

A bronze service star is authorized for participation in subsequent U.S. military operations authorized for award of the AFEM (only one award is authorized for each designated U.S. military operation). A silver service star is worn in lieu of five bronze service stars.

The Arrowhead device is authorized for United States Army, United States Air Force, and United States Space Force personnel who are awarded the medal through participation in an airborne or amphibious assault.

The Fleet Marine Force Combat Operation Insignia is authorized for U.S. Navy service members assigned to Marine Corps units that participate in combat during the assignment.

Criteria
The Armed Forces Expeditionary Medal may be authorized for three categories of operations: U.S. military operations; U.S. military operations in direct support of the United Nations; and U.S. operations of assistance for friendly foreign nations. 
The medal shall be awarded only for operations for which no other U.S. campaign medal is approved, where a foreign armed opposition or imminent threat of hostile action was encountered.

Since its original conception in 1961, the Armed Forces Expeditionary Medal has been awarded for United States participation in over forty five designated military campaigns.  The first campaign of the AFEM was the Cuban Missile Crisis and the award was issued for military service between October 1962 and June 1963.  Following this original issuance, the AFEM was made retroactive to 1958 and issued for actions in Lebanon, Taiwan, Republic of the Congo, Quemoy and Matsu, and for duty in Berlin between 1961 and 1963.

During the early years of the Vietnam War, the Armed Forces Expeditionary Medal was issued for initial operations in South Vietnam, Laos, and Cambodia.  The Armed Forces Expeditionary Medal was intended to replace the Marine Corps Expeditionary Medal and Navy Expeditionary Medal, but this never occurred and both services continue to award their service expeditionary medals and the AFEM, though not concurrently for the same action.

In 1965, with the creation of the Vietnam Service Medal, the AFEM was discontinued for Vietnam War service. As the Vietnam Service Medal was retroactively authorized, those personnel who had previously received the AFEM were granted the option to exchange the Armed Forces Expeditionary Medal for the Vietnam Service Medal. Because of these awards during the Vietnam War period, some military personnel have been awarded both the Armed Forces Expeditionary Medal & the Vietnam Service Medal. Some military advisers involved in the 1973 Arab–Israeli War were also awarded the medal for their involvement in the supply and training of the IDF on the use and deployment of anti-tank weapons.

In the 1990s, it was awarded to numerous Naval ships such as  who enforced the Dayton Peace Accords and operated in the Adriatic Sea enforcing UN arms embargo against Croatia and Bosnia-Herzegovina and participating in Operation Sharp Guard and Operation Joint Endeavor up through and during the Bosnian crisis.

In 2003, with the creation of the Global War on Terrorism Expeditionary Medal, the AFEM was discontinued for Iraq, Saudi Arabia, and Kuwait. After 18 March 2003, some personnel became eligible for the Armed Forces Expeditionary Medal, as well as the Global War on Terrorism Expeditionary Medal. Only one medal may be awarded, however, and individuals or units that deployed to the Gulf for Operation Southern Watch, and then immediately transitioned to Operation Iraqi Freedom, are not eligible for both medals.

Beginning in 1992 an effort was begun to phase out the AFEM in favor of campaign specific medals and the newly created Armed Forces Service Medal.  The Armed Forces Service Medal was also originally intended to be a replacement for the Armed Forces Expeditionary Medal, however the two awards are currently considered separate awards with different award criteria. The primary difference between the two is that the Armed Forces Expeditionary Medal is normally awarded for combat operations and combat support missions.

Approved operations

U.S. military operations

After the close of the Vietnam War, the Armed Forces Expeditionary Medal was issued for various military operations in Panama, Grenada, and Libya Operation El Dorado Canyon.

U.S. operations in direct support of the United Nations
The medal is also authorized for several United Nations actions, such as peacekeeping efforts in Somalia.

U.S. operations in direct support of NATO operations
The medal is also authorized for NATO peacekeeping operations in Bosnia and Herzegovina and Croatia.

U.S. operations of assistance for a friendly foreign nation
The AFEM has been issued for numerous operations in the Persian Gulf, most notably Operation Earnest Will, which began in 1987 and lasted until the eve of Operation Desert Shield.  Following the close of Desert Storm, and the engagement in peacekeeping and sanction missions against Iraq, the Armed Forces Expeditionary Medal was issued again for several operations such as Operation Northern Watch, Operation Southern Watch, and Operation Vigilant Sentinel.

Similar awards

Similar awards of the Armed Forces Expeditionary Medal:

The Global War on Terrorism Expeditionary Medal (the AFEM is no longer issued for operations in the Middle East, but may be reactivated for future campaigns which may not qualify for either the Global War on Terrorism Expeditionary Medal, Iraq Campaign Medal, and Afghanistan Campaign Medal). Similar in nature to the AFEM, the GWOTEM is awarded for deploying abroad on or after Sept. 11, 2001 (and a future date to be determined), for service in Operation Enduring Freedom (OEF) or Operation Iraqi Freedom (OIF). Service stars are also authorized for the Global War on Terrorism Expeditionary Medal effective February 9, 2015, retroactive to September, 11, 2001. Each service star represents a deployment in support of an approved GWOT operation. Only one GWOT-EM is awarded for each operation (five bronze service stars are authorized for six approved deployment operations). The GWOT-EM approved operations by inclusive dates are:

Enduring Freedom: September 11, 2001 – present
Iraqi Freedom: March 19, 2003 - August 31, 2010 
Nomad Shadow: November 5, 2007 – present
New Dawn (Operation Iraqi Freedom renamed): September 1, 2010 – December 31, 2011
Inherent Resolve: June 15, 2014 – present
Freedom's Sentinel: January 1, 2015 – present

The Navy Expeditionary Medal and the Marine Corps Expeditionary Medal.  In the modern era, service members who were authorized one of these medals are occasionally permitted to choose between receipt of the Armed Forces Expeditionary Medal or the service specific expeditionary medal. The AFEM and the Navy/Marine Expeditionary Medal cannot be bestowed simultaneously for the same action.

The Air Force Expeditionary Service Ribbon. Although similar in name, this award is unrelated to the Armed Forces Expeditionary Medal and is presented for duty performed on U.S. Air Force deployments.

See also
 Awards and decorations of the United States military
 U.S. Army Institute of Heraldry
 National Personnel Records Center (Military Personnel Records Center)

Notes

References

Bibliography

 (US) Army Regulation 600-8-22 Chapter 2-12, Tables 2-2, 2-3 and 2-4, dated 11 December 2006.

Awards established in 1961
United States campaign medals
United States expeditionary medals